Mian Zamin (also Romanized as Mīān Zamīn; also known as Anjīr-e Zīrakī (Persian: انجيرزيركي)) is a village in Gavkan Rural District, in the Central District of Rigan County, Kerman Province, Iran. At the 2006 census, its population was 287, in 63 families.

References 

Populated places in Rigan County